Norman Fischer may refer to:

 Zoketsu Norman Fischer (born 1946), American poet, writer, and Soto Zen priest
 Norman Fischer (cellist) (born 1949), American cellist

See also  
 Norman Fisher (disambiguation)